Deirdre Frances O'Connor (born 5 February 1941) is an Australian lawyer, academic, former Judge of the Federal Court, President of the Administrative Appeals Tribunal, and President of the Australian Industrial Relations Commission.

Early life and education 

O'Connor went to school at Bethlehem College, Ashfield. Bachelor of Arts from University of Sydney 1961. School teacher from 1961 to 1969. Studied law at the University of Sydney, graduating with first class honours in 1974.

Career
O'Connor combined her education in teaching and law to be a lecturer in law at the University of NSW, Australian Film and Television School and Macquarie University between 1974 and 1980. In 1978 O'Connor was appointed by the Australian government as its representative at the UNESCO conference on the teaching of human rights. She became a barrister in 1980 and in 1983 was appointed as a member of the NSW Law Reform Commission. Appointed Chairman of the Australian Broadcasting Tribunal in 1986.

In 2008 O'Connor conducted an inquiry into the appointment, management and termination of Dr Graeme Stephen Reeves.

Federal Court of Australia

O'Connor was the first woman appointed to the Federal Court, and for much of her time on the bench O'Connor was president of either the Administrative Appeals Tribunal or the Australian Industrial Relations Commission. O'Connor resigned from the Federal Court, despite being some 10 years short of the mandatory retirement age.

Administrative Appeals Tribunal
O'Connor was president of the Administrative Appeals Tribunal from 1990 until 1994 and then again from 1999 until 2002.

Australian Industrial Relations Commission
O'Connor was appointed President of the Australian Industrial Relations Commission in 1994, a position she held until 1997. During her presidency the Commission decided the Family Leave test case, which gave effect to effect to the International Labour Organization convention on Workers with Family Responsibilities, Recommendation. established a right to family leave, including a right to take sick leave to care for a member of the employees family. with a cap of 5 days carers leave per year. O'Connor also led the full bench which decided the Public Holidays test case which determined that, while public holidays were determined by state governments, employees under federal award should receive at least 10 public holidays per year. The Commission also gave effect to the Superannuation guarantee scheme in the Superannuation test case by providing an award right to the payment of superannuation. In the Supported Wage System case the Commission established a model award clause intended to assist people with disabilities to obtain employment. The Commission also determined the proper approach to the legislative protection on the right to strike in the ABC case.

See also
List of the first women holders of political offices in Oceania

References

 

Judges of the Federal Court of Australia
1941 births
Living people
Australian women judges
Sydney Law School alumni
University of Sydney alumni